Andrea Tarlao (born 8 January 1994) is an Italian paralympic cyclist who won a bronze medal at the 2016 Summer Paralympics.

References

External links
 

1994 births
Living people
Paralympic cyclists of Italy
Paralympic gold medalists for Italy
Medalists at the 2012 Summer Paralympics
Medalists at the 2016 Summer Paralympics
Medalists at the 2020 Summer Paralympics
Paralympic medalists in cycling
Cyclists at the 2016 Summer Paralympics
People from Gorizia
Cyclists from Friuli Venezia Giulia